Bruce Carlsten is a senior research and development engineer at the Los Alamos National Laboratory (LANL).

In 1985 Carlsten received his PhD from Stanford University following a BS from UCLA in 1979, then was a Fellow of the IEEE, the American Physical Society, and the Los Alamos National Laboratory.

He was the leader of the High-Power Electrodynamics group at LANL From 2005 to 2012. In this role he oversaw this group's projects researching free-electron lasers, high-power and high-frequency microwave sources and effects, and accelerator components. then became the chief scientist for LANL's Navy-funded Free Electron Laser oscillator project and is director of design at the Laboratory's future X-ray Free Electron Laser, the MaRIE (Matter-Radiation Interactions in Extremes) facility.

In 2016 Carlsten was named a fellow of the Institute of Electrical and Electronics Engineers (IEEE)  for his contributions to the development of high-brightness electron beams and vacuum electron devices. In 2020, he will receive the American Physical Society's Division of the Physics of Beams' Wilson Prize.

References 

Fellow Members of the IEEE
Living people
Engineers from New Mexico
1954 births